Richard Conyngham Corfield (27 April 1882 – 9 August 1913) was a British colonial police officer who saw service in South Africa, Nigeria, India, Kenya  and Somalia in the early 20th century. His death at the hands of Darawiish Ibraahin Xoorane and Axmed Aarey was chronicled in the poem Annagoo Taleex naal.

Early life
Corfield was born in Heanor, Derbyshire, the eldest of three children of the rector of Heanor, Conyngham William George Corfield and Henrietta, née Edwards. Corfield was only six years old when his father died. He first attended a dame school. In 1892 he attended Spurlings Preparatory School and then in 1896 went to Marlborough College.

Early career
After leaving school Corfield worked for a shipping company in Liverpool, the T. & J. Harrison Line, run by an uncle, Thomas Fenwick Harrison. Soon after starting work the Anglo-Boer war broke out in South Africa. Corfield immediately joined the Volunteers camped on Salisbury Plain, but later enlisted in the Baden Powell Police, sailing for Africa in December 1900. In June 1902 he was recommended for a commission, but this was rejected due to his youth.

In 1905 Corfield returned to England, applied for the post of Political Officer in Somaliland, and became one of only six Europeans posted to the interior of the country. There the emir of  Diiriye Guure, called "the Mad Mullah", was inciting local people against the British. By 1910 he had been subdued but not beaten.

In May 1910 Corfield again returned to England, but by September he was on his way to Nigeria where the British were already in conflict with Muslim inhabitants from the north part of the country. He saw action at Ganawari and other skirmishes.

Further trouble was brewing in British Somaliland, and a Somaliland Camel Constabulary was formed to serve as a police force in the interior. Horace Byatt, the Governor of British Somaliland, offered the command of the new Camel Constabulary to Corfield, who accepted the opportunity to return to the Horn of Africa.

Return to Somaliland
The Camel Constabulary took to the field in December 1912 and Corfield was authorised to punish those opposing British rule – however he was instructed to avoid a direct confrontation with Mohammed Abdullah Hassan. By mid-1913 finding these instructions restrictive and irksome, on the afternoon of 8 August 1913 he decided to attack the Dervish army close to Dul Madoba.

Dul Madoba is a ridge some 25 miles SE of Burao in what was then British Somaliland. The battle took place on 9 August 1913 between 110 members of the Somaliland Camel Constabulary, reduced to 85 by the time action commenced, and some 2,750 well-armed Dervish followers of the Mullah. Of the Constabulary, 36 including Richard Corfield were killed-in-action and 21 were wounded. On the Dervish side over 450 were killed or wounded. As a result of the action the British withdrew their protection of the local tribes to the area around the port of Berbera but the Mullah's men were unable to follow up this advantage immediately.

Death
Darawiish veterans of the Dul Madoba battle have claimed that Ibraahin Xoorane  killed Richard Corfield:

The Darawiish artillery commander who provided cover for Xoorane to shoot was Axmed Xasan Aarey, although Axmed Aarey died in the same Dul Madoba battle:

References

Bartholet, Jeffrey. It's a Mad, Mad, Mad, Mad World, Newsweek, 12 October 2009, pp. 43–47.
Battersby, Henry Francis Prevost. Richard Corfield of Somaliland (1914) ASIN: B000WFUQT8

Notes

1882 births
1913 deaths
People educated at Marlborough College
People from Heanor
British colonial police officers
British military personnel killed in action
British people in British Nigeria
British expatriates in South Africa
British expatriates in Somalia
British people in colonial India
British people in British Kenya